The 2017 Jerez FIA Formula 2 round was a pair of motor races held on 7 and 8 October 2017 at the Circuito de Jerez in Jerez de la Frontera, Spain as part of the FIA Formula 2 Championship. It was the tenth and penultimate round of the 2017 FIA Formula 2 Championship.

After a disappointing round in Monza for championship leader Charles Leclerc with a total of 0 points to his name, the Monégasque driver took yet another pole position and prematurely clinched the championship title by winning his sixth race of the season with three races to spare. With only one weekend to go, Leclerc was leading the championship with an unassailable lead by 60 points over current runner-up Oliver Rowland.
 
As of 2022, Leclerc holds the record for the most pole positions in a Formula 2 season with eight.

Classifications

Qualifying

Feature Race

Sprint Race

Championship standings after the round

Drivers' Championship standings

Teams' Championship standings

 Note: Only the top five positions are included for both sets of standings.

See also 
 2017 Jerez GP3 Series round

References

External links 
 

Jerez
Formula 2
Formula 2